Sylk may refer to:

 Sylk, a character from Glitter (film)
 Symbolic Link (SYLK), a Microsoft file format typically used to exchange data between applications, specifically spreadsheets